Kim Ljung (born 17 October 1971) is a musician from Tønsberg, Norway. He is best known as the bassist in Norwegian alternative rock band Seigmen and industrial band Zeromancer. He also appeared as guest vocalist on SubGud's Time Machine.

Early career 

Kim Ljung started his musical career as bass player and songsmith in the band Klisne Seigmenn in 1989. In addition to Kim, the band consisted of his kindergarten buddy Marius Roth Christensen on guitar, singer Alex Møklebust, drummer Noralf Ronthi and guitarist Sverre Økshoff.

In the beginning, the band viewed it more as fun than as a serious outlet for their musical and artistic inspirations, playing a punkish style of rock but that changed rapidly.

Seigmen 

In 1992, the band changed its name to Seigmen and released its first official album – the dark and unpolished Pluto – which took both the musical underground and many journalists by storm. On it they combined dark progressive rock elements with punk rock, grunge, heavy metal and perhaps a little Gothic rock. During the summer and fall, the CD was reissued in several editions to satisfy the growing number of fans. Combined with a powerful and memorable stage act, the band soon turned into a household name in the underground music scene.

In the mid-1990s, with albums such as Ameneon (1993) and Total (1994), the band cemented its position as one of the most important and innovative in Norwegian music history and the number of fans swelled well beyond underground status.

The apex of commercial success was reached with the album Metropolis in 1995. It made its debut, in week 44, at the number 1 spot on the VG Album Charts. Within a few days it sold to Gold (25,000 copies) and didn't stop until it had passed 50,000. This is a good figure for any artist in a small country like Norway.
 
The second half of the decade saw the band move in a more electronic direction with Radiowaves, their last proper studio album, in 1997.

In 1999, by the time their greatest hits album, Monument 1989–1999, was released, Sverre had decided to leave the band to focus on his family. An old agreement among the members was that if one of them left, they should disband Seigmen. And that is what happened after their final concert at Rockefeller concert hall in Oslo on March 6, 1999.

Seigmen played live at the 2012 Slottsfjell festival in Tønsberg, which was a celebrating its 10th anniversary. In 2015 Seigmen released a new album "Enola".

Zeromancer 

With the departure of Sverre the other members were free to form new constellations. Somehow, Marius got left out so he went on to take an education in classical music and has since appeared on both TV and radio as lead singer for choirs. The remaining three - Kim, Alex and Noralf - formed the industrial group Zeromancer with former Vampire State Building keyboard-player Erik Lunggren and the American Chris Schleyer.

Zeromancer never managed to reach the same heights, neither with respect to musical innovation nor in popularity, as Seigmen had. But they've toured extensively both in Europe and America, and they seem to have grown fairly popular in Germany with their take on industrial metal.

So far the band has released six albums, Clone Your Lover in 2000, Eurotrash in 2001, ZZYZX in 2003, Sinners International in 2009, The Death Of Romance in 2010 and Bye-Bye Borderline in 2013.

Ljungblut 

Kim Ljung has also been active on his own. Over the years material that didn't fit in with Zeromancer has gathered weight until at some point in 2004 he felt compelled to collect some of the songs and release his first solo album. And due to the number of songs it turned out to be a double album!

The double CD, The other side of all things, was released on Pleasuredisc Records on February 26, 2005 under the alias Ljungblut. The sound is a lot more acoustic and melancholic than what we ever heard from Seigmen, but the melodies and lyrics are strong and personal and this is certainly a contender for the title Best Norwegian Album of the Year.

The future 

Ljungblut and Zeromancer are both scheduled for new releases next year. As well as a Seigmen DVD containing the reunion show, videos, interviews, and a documentary with unreleased material.

Different members are actively pursuing their own side projects; Alex has been working as producer for a few Norwegian artists - such as Gåte and Don Juan Dracula, Erik has lent his keyboard and computer skills out to such various artists as the Swiss electro band Undergod and Norwegian black metal acts Satyricon.

Even Seigmen may still have a future, though all the members deny it, because they agreed to do "one last" concert during the UKA-festival in Trondheim on October 20, 2005. Six 
years after disbanding the band they stood on stage together again, in front of an audience of more than 5000 people. After this success they went on a small tour in Norway in the summer of 2006.

Full Kim Discography
Seigmen
 Det Finnes Alltid En Utvei [Demo] (1990)
 Pluto [EP] (1992)
 Ameneon [Album] (1993)
 Monsun [Single] (1993)
 Total [Album] (1994)
 Hjernen er Alene [Single] (1994)
 Döderlein [Single] (1994)
 Lament [Single] (1994)
 Metropolis [Album] (1995)
 Metropolis [Single] (1995)
 Slaver av Solen [Single] (1995)
 Metropolis - The Grandmaster Recordings [Album] (1995)
 Radiowaves [Album] (1997)
 The First Wave [Single] (1997)
 The Next Wave [Single] (1997)
 The Opera For The Crying Machinery [Promo] (1997)
 Mørkets Øy [Single](1997)
 Monument [Album](1999)
 Rockefeller [Album] (2006)
 Döderlein [live single] (2006)
 Enola [Album] (2015)

DVD
 Fra x til døden (2006)

Zeromancer
 Clone Your Lover [Album] (2000)
 Clone Your Lover [Promo] (2000)
 Eurotrash [Album] (2001)
 Eurotrash [Promo] (2001)
 Doctor Online [Single] (2001)
 Need You Like A Drug [Promo] (2001)
 Zzyzx [Album](2003)
 Famous Last Words [Promo] (2003)
 Famous Last Words [Single] (2003)
 Erotic Saints [Promo] (2003)
 Eurotrash [DVD] (2004)
 Doppelganger I love you [Promo] (2007)
 I'm yours to lose [Single] (2007)
 Sinners International [Album] (2009)
 It Sounds Like Love (But It Looks Like Sex) [EP] (2009)
 The Death of Romance [Album] (2010)
 Bye-Bye Borderline [Album] (2013)

Ljungblut
 Family Album [Promo] (2004)
 Influences For a New Album (2005)
 The Other Side of All Things [Album, Russian Edition] (2005)
 Capitals [Album] (2007)
 Capitals [Album, Russian Edition] (2007)
 Over Skyene Skinner Alltid Solen (2011)
 Ikke Alle Netter Er Like Sorte (2016)
 Villa Carlotta 5959 (2018)

Guest appearances in songs
 SubGud - Time Machine (Kim did vocals, released on Magnet)

External links 
 Seigmen.org. Accessed September 28, 2008
 Korsfarer. Accessed September 28, 2008
 Zeromancer. Accessed September 28, 2008
 Ljungblut. Accessed September 28, 2008
 VG Album Charts, Week 44, 1995. Accessed September 28, 2008
 Undergod article. Accessed September 28, 2008
 UKA 2005 with Seigmen live. Accessed August 18, 2005
 Kim Ljung - Russian fan's community. Accessed September 28, 2008

1971 births
Living people
Industrial musicians
Norwegian rock musicians
Norwegian songwriters
Musicians from Tønsberg
Norwegian rock bass guitarists
Alternative rock musicians
Norwegian heavy metal bass guitarists
Norwegian male bass guitarists
Alternative metal bass guitarists
21st-century Norwegian bass guitarists
21st-century Norwegian male musicians
Pigface members